is a Japanese heavy metal band from Hachiōji, Tokyo. Their lineup has consisted of vocalist Daisuke-han, drummer Nao, guitarist Maximum the Ryo-kun, and bassist Ue-chan since 1999. Each member alternates singing lead vocals, often within the same song, with the exception of Ue-chan, who provides backup vocals almost exclusively.

The group is best known for their unconventional and experimental style of alternative metal music. Over their career, they have found success incorporating elements of heavy metal, hardcore punk, hip hop, pop, funk, and ska into their sound. Stylistically, their music runs the gamut from being dark and serious, to ironic or humorous, often with drastic shifts in tempo and mood over the course of a song. The band's eclectic nature frequently draws comparisons to System of a Down.

History

1998–2001: Formation, early days, and line-up change

Maximum the Hormone was formed in 1998 by vocalist Daisuke-han and drummer Nao. After recruiting guitarist Key and bassist Sugi, and having played some regional shows, the band signed a contract with the Japanese rock label Sky Records. A.S.A. Crew was the first album released under that label and was the only full-length album released by the original lineup. At that time Daisuke wrote his lyrics completely in English, and the band name Maximum the Hormone was written in Latin letters. Key and Sugi left the band in 1999.

The band then recruited Nao's younger brother Maximum the Ryo-kun, who had played guitar since junior high school and could also sing. From then on, Ryo-kun became the band's co-lead vocalist, handling singing duties while Daisuke handles screams and raps. The lineup was completed by bassist Ue-chan joining shortly after Ryo. The band then decided to write their band name in katakana to reflect the change in the band members, and the band also started incorporating Japanese into their lyrics. In 2001, the band released an EP, Hō.

When asked about the group's name in an interview, Maximum the Ryo-kun stated "Take it as you like, it means anything from the Japanese cuisine for cooking animal innards to the sensation of the maximum amount of your hormones coming to the boil! Although when we go abroad people think we’re just some sorta sexual-energy-drink". "Hormone" (or horumon) is a style of yakiniku (Japanese BBQ) where many of the typically discarded internal organs are grilled in bite sized pieces and eaten.

2002–2007: Commercial success
In 2002, the band left Sky Records and signed with Mimikajiru Records. The band released the single, "Niku Cup", followed by a full-length album, Mimi Kajiru, in 2002. The EP Kusoban, released in 2004, featured heavy music mixed with light pop that has gained them mainstream attention. After the release of Kusoban, the band signed to VAP, a major record label.

The band released the full-length album Rokkinpo Goroshi in 2005 The release caused a surge in their fanbase, as they began to sell out more shows, playing many rock festivals, and eventually releasing a live DVD, Debu Vs. Debu. In addition, "Rolling1000toon" was featured as an ending theme in the Air Master anime, as well as being featured in DrumMania 10th Mix as a playable song. The song's title is actually a play on words. Combined, the number 1000 (pronounced "sen"), and "toon" (pronounced "ton") form the phrase "rolling senton". A senton is a leaping move, in pro wrestling, that often includes somersaults. The concept is illustrated at the end of the music video, when the protagonist (bassist Ue-chan) fells the bully character by leaping into the air, doing several mid-air flips, then landing the final blow.

In 2006 the band entered popular culture with the song "Koi no Mega Lover", which reached number nine on the Oricon charts during the summer – their first top-ten hit in Japan. The band had three of their songs featured in anime series: "What's Up, People?!" and "Zetsubō Billy" are featured as the second opening and ending themes of  Death Note, and "Akagi" is featured as the ending theme for Akagi.

Maximum the Hormone released their next album, Bu-ikikaesu, in 2007 The album debuted at number five on the Oricon chart; their first full album to reach that chart. Also, the album was certified Gold in Japan.

2008–2010: First and second hiatus

In 2008, the band released their second live DVD: Deco Vs. Deco, and made their first overseas appearances with a short tour through the United States and Canada in support of Dropkick Murphys. On May 3, Maximum the Hormone performed at the hide memorial summit alongside many other artists, in memory of the deceased musician. A new single titled "Tsume Tsume Tsume/F" was released at the start of the Tsume Tsume Tsume tour in July, and reached the number two spot on the Oricon weekly singles chart. The tour continued through October 2008, with an additional show on November 30. The subject of the song "F" is Dragon Ball character, Frieza.

On October 27, Maximum The Hormone made their first appearance in the United Kingdom, supporting Enter Shikari at the Bournemouth BIC. They continued to tour with Enter Shikari until November 3, playing venues in Exeter, Southampton and Folkestone, before ending with two nights at the London Astoria. However, prior to the Enter Shikari dates, it was announced that Daisuke would require corrective surgery on his throat, causing the band to go on temporary hiatus while he recovered. The hiatus started in December and lasted for several months. After Daisuke recovered from throat surgery the band went on to headline several shows in Japan with support from Bring Me the Horizon and Blessed by a Broken Heart in May 2009, as well as winning the award for Best Rock Video for "Tsume Tsume Tsume" in the 2009 MTV Video Music Awards Japan.

In 2009, Megadeth guitarist Marty Friedman performed an instrumental cover of "Tsume Tsume Tsume" on his tribute/cover album Tokyo Jukebox. Though not mentioned in the title, near the end of the track he segues into an abbreviated version of the song "Louisiana Bob"- On November 19, 2009, the band released a statement via their official website stating that drummer Nao was pregnant, but after discussions with her bandmates and staff, Nao decided to continue with all shows. However, on November 3 Nao fell ill and was transported to the hospital, where she was told that it would be unhealthy for her and the baby to continue performing. This resulted in the band going on hiatus until Nao carried the baby to term, forcing them to cancel all shows including an appearance at the Soundwave Festival 2010 in Australia. On May 6, 2010, the band released a statement through their website stating that Nao gave birth to a healthy baby girl and that they would no longer be on hiatus. The band members appeared as extras in the live-action adaptation of BECK.

2011–2014: Return to activity and Yoshū Fukushū
On February 7, 2011, the band released a video for the songs "Chiisana Kimi no Te (小さな君の手)" (Your Little Hands)  and "Maximum the Hormone" on their official website. They released a single titled "Greatest the Hits 2011–2011" on March 23, debuting at number 1 spot on the Oricon weekly singles chart. In June of the same year, they toured Europe. In early August they played at Pentaport Rock Festival in Incheon, South Korea.

The album Yoshū Fukushū was released on July 31, 2013, their first full album in six years. It was their first album to reach number one on Oricon's charts. The CD features unique packaging, as it is approximately the height and width of a standard DVD case, and bound like a manga. According to the band's official website, it is "A frantic 156-page book with 'Our Merciless Home'war'k' descriptions, a dialogue style track-by-track rundown for all 15 songs by Maximum the Ryo-kun, Ryo-kun's inner world is exposed by professional manga artists"

On June 2, the group released the video for the song "A-L-I-E-N", but as a prank, they placed it on a randomly relocating URL, so page visitors would only have one chance of seeing the video. The video for the album's title track, "Yoshū Fukushū", was released on July 26, 2013. The song "Benjo Sandal Dance" (Toilet Sandal Dance) had been used in a Stride gum commercial, featuring the band in full special effects makeup as early primates. In keeping with the band's quirky aesthetic, the song "Benjo Sandal Dance" lyrically references Maximum the Ryo-kun's habit of wearing toilet sandals, traditionally strictly only for wearing in the bathroom, at all times. As referenced in the song's lyrics, as well as their FAQ, he exclusively wears toilet sandals sold under the brand name VIC, made by Nishibe Chemical Co. Ltd. Dunhill. In September, the band announced a special merchandise package, including a T-shirt and limited edition VIC sandals with the Maximum the Hormone logo stamped on the heel.

2015–present: Third hiatus and signing with Warner Music Japan
In November 2015, the band released their third live album, Deka vs. Deka. The album also came with a complete re-recording of their 2002 album Mimi Kajiru as a bonus disc. The re-recording, entitled Mimi Kajiru Shinuchi, was also released alongside a book containing sheet music for the songs on Yoshu Fukushu, which was released in February 2016. The band was in the midst of another hiatus as drummer Nao announced her intention to try for another baby; her second child was born in May 2016. The band returned to activity in 2017, announcing the Mimi Kajiru Shinuchi Tour across Japan.

In September 2018, the band released a track entitled "Haikei VAP-dono" (with Daisuke playing drums), to announce their departure from VAP to sign a new record deal with Warner Music Japan. A series of shows in October and November 2018 were cancelled due to Daisuke suffering a herniated disc. In November 2018, they released a music video for "Korekara no Menkata Kotteri no Hanashi wo Shiyou", which commented on fans' negative response to Maximum the Ryo-kun's dramatic weight loss. An EP also titled Korekara no Menkata Cottelee no Hanashi wo Shiyou was released on November 28, 2018. On May 5, 2019, the band made a surprise appearance at the Viva La Rock 2019 festival, announcing that they would resume live performances and launch a June 2019 tour of Japan.

In 2021, the band released the song , which was used as the opening theme for the anime Record of Ragnarok. Their song "Hawatari 2 Oku-senchi" was featured as one of the twelve ending theme songs for the anime Chainsaw Man.

Musical style
Maximum the Hormone performs nu metal and hardcore punk but incorporates many elements of pop, funk, ska, hip hop, and extreme metal into their music as well. The band is also labeled as alternative metal, funk metal, groove metal, and more recently metalcore by some critics. AllMusic's Alexey Eremenko writes that Maximum the Hormone is distinguished by "a general lack of the teenage angst and self-importance characteristic of true nu-metalers." Their funky sound, heard in many songs such as "Maximum 21st Century", is mostly produced by bass player Ue-Chan's unconventional use of the slapping technique; he is often referred to as "The Chopper" by the band (both in their FAQ, and their song "A-L-I-E-N"). Lead vocals are split between Daisuke, Ryo, and Nao, with Ryo and Nao providing the melodic vocals while Daisuke provides the screams and rapping. Ue-Chan is yet to perform lead vocals (aside from a verse on the joke track "Chiisana Kimi no Te") but does perform backing vocals alongside the rest of the band.

Their music-videos often have a tongue-in-cheek aspect as well, such as "Rolling1000t00n", which features an underdog (with the requisite karate training montage) facing up to a bully, or "Koi no Mega Lover", which features an awkward young man whose clumsy amorous advances are rejected by a beautiful girl at a party.

Band members
Current members
  – screaming vocals, rapping (1998–present), additional drums (2018–present), percussion (2020–present), keyboards (2021–present)
  – drums, percussion, clean vocals (1998–present)
  – guitar, clean vocals (1999–present), unclean vocals (2007–present)
  – bass, backing vocals (1999–present)

Former members
Sugi – guitar (1998–1999)
Key – bass (1998–1999)

Timeline

Discography

A.S.A. Crew (1999)
Hō (2001)
Mimi Kajiru (2002)
Kusoban (2004)
Rokkinpo Goroshi (2005)
Bu-ikikaesu (2007)
Yoshū Fukushū (2013)
Mimi Kajiru Shinuchi (2015)

Awards and nominations
CD Shop Awards

|-
| 2014
| Yoshū Fukushū
| Grand Prix
| 
|}

MTV Video Music Awards Japan

|-
| 2009
| "Tsume Tsume Tsume"
| Best Rock Video
| 
|-
| 2014
| Yoshū Fukushū
| Album of the Year
| 
|}

Space Shower Music Video Awards

|-
| 2009
| Maximum the Hormone
| Special Award
| 
|-
| 2012
| "Maximum the Hormone"
| Best Your Choice
| 
|-
| 2014
| "Yoshū Fukushū"
| Best Video of the Year
| 
|}

Tours and concerts

Japan
 Punkspring with Various Artists (2007)
 Cursive Japan Tour with guests Maximum the Hormone and Beat Crusaders (2007)
 Rock in Japan Festival with Various Artists (2007)
 Rising Sun Rock Festival with Various Artists (2007)
 Summer Sonic Festival with Various Artists (2008)
 Summer Sonic Festival with Various Artists (2011)
 Rock in Japan Festival with Various Artists (2012)
 Ozzfest Japan with Various Artists (2013)
 Summer Sonic Festival with Various Artists (2013)
 Rock in Japan Festival with Various Artists (2013)
 Knotfest Japan with Various Artists (2014)
 Summer Sonic Festival with Various Artists (2017)

Overseas
 Enter Shikari Tour in UK with guests Maximum the Hormone and P-Dex (2008)
 Enter Shikari Tour in UK with guests Maximum the Hormone, Canterbury, and P-Dex (2008)
 Enter Shikari Tour in UK with guests Maximum the Hormone, An Albatross, and P-Dex (2008)
 Dropkick Murphys Tour in US with guest Maximum the Hormone (2008)
 Hellfest in France with Various Artists (2011)
 Pentaport Rock Festival in South Korea with Various Artists (2011)
 Knotfest in US with Various Artists (2014)
 Knotfest in Mexico with Various Artists (2017)
 Super Japan Expo in Chile with Various Artists (2017)
 European Tour 2022

References

External links

 Maximum the Hormone official website 
 Maximum the Hormone official English website

Japanese hardcore punk groups
Japanese metalcore musical groups
Japanese nu metal musical groups
Musical groups from Hachiōji, Tokyo
Musical groups established in 1998
Sibling musical groups